Learning to Rock is the debut album by the Finnish band Sturm und Drang. It spawned "Rising Son" and "Forever" (only radio promo single) as its first two singles. The band members were only 15 and 16 years old when the album was released. The album was released in Germany, Austria and Switzerland on August 24, 2007, and the versions released there had different cover and different track lists. One version was the same in Finland, but their German label GUN Records released an Amazon special version which included a cover of Judas Priests "Breaking the Law", the video for "Rising Son" and an EPK interview. They also recorded a new version of "Forever", featuring Udo Dirkschneider on backing vocals.

Track listing

"Broken" (A.Linman/P.Linman) 
"Talking to Silence" (A.Linman/P.Linman/M.Persson)
"Forever" (A.Linman/P.Linman/M.Persson)
"Rising Son" (A.Linman/P.Linman/M.Persson)
"The Raven" (A.Linman/P.Linman)
"Indian" (A.Linman/P.Linman)
"Learning to Rock" (A.Linman/P.Linman/M.Persson)
"Fly Away" (A.Linman/P.Linman/M.Persson)
"Mortals" (P.Linman/A.Linman/Caleb/J.Nikula)
"Miseria" (A.Linman/P.Linman/M.Persson)

Special editions

The German record company GUN Records released two versions in Germany, Switzerland and Austria (GSA). One contain the same tracks as the Finnish one and the Rising Son video, and one Amazon special edition. The Finnish record company HMC will release a new version entitled: "Learning To Rock: International version´, which contain bonus tracks

German Amazon special edition Bonus-tacks:
Breaking the Law (Judas Priest cover)
Rising Son (video)
EPK Interview (video)

International edition Bonus-tracks
Forever (feat. Udo Dirkschneider)
Breaking the Law (Judas Priest cover)
Rising Son (video)
Indian (video)

Japanese edition Bonus-tracks
Forever (feat. Udo Dirkschneider)
Breaking the Law (Judas Priest cover)
Rising Son (acoustic version)
Rising Son (video)
Sturm und Drang EPK (video)

Singles
"Rising Son"
"Forever"
"Indian"

References

Sturm und Drang (band) albums
2007 albums
GUN Records albums